Coal Creek is a tributary of the Clinch River in Tennessee, approximately  long.

Coal Creek flows northward along the southeastern base of Cross Mountain, slicing a narrow valley in which the communities of Briceville and Fraterville are located, to Lake City, a town formerly named Coal Creek, at the base of the Cumberland Plateau. The creek's confluence with the Clinch River is east of Lake City and below Norris Dam, near the Interstate 75 highway bridge across the river.

Beech Grove Fork is its largest tributary stream. Coal Creek's water quality is affected by coal surface mining, municipal wastewater discharges, and channelization.

See also
 Coal Creek War
 List of rivers of Tennessee

References

External links
Coal Creek Watershed Foundation

Rivers of Anderson County, Tennessee
Rivers of Tennessee
Tributaries of the Tennessee River